Las Alpacas Airport is an airport serving Parral, a city in the Maule Region of Chile.

See also

Transport in Chile
List of airports in Chile

References

External links
OpenStreetMap - Las Alpacas
OurAirports - Las Alpacas
FallingRain - Las Alpacas Airport

Airports in Chile
Airports in Maule Region